Østfold Arbeiderblad was a Norwegian newspaper, published in Sarpsborg in Østfold county.

History and profile
Østfold Arbeiderblad was started as a weekly newspaper in 1933 as the Communist Party of Norway organ in the county. It went defunct in December 1937 as a consequence of the party's decision to prop up the main newspaper Arbeideren.

References

1933 establishments in Norway
1937 disestablishments in Norway
Communist Party of Norway newspapers
Defunct newspapers published in Norway
Newspapers published in Norway
Norwegian-language newspapers
Mass media in Østfold
Publications established in 1933
Publications disestablished in 1937
Sarpsborg
Defunct weekly newspapers